Bone & Bari is an album by American jazz trombonist Curtis Fuller, recorded in 1957 and released on the Blue Note label as BLP 1572.

Reception

The AllMusic review by Lee Bloom stated: "The session is unique in its pairing of trombone with the baritone sax of Tate Houston. The resultant front line sound is thick and rotund."

Track listing
All compositions by Curtis Fuller except as indicated
 "Algonquin" - 5:04
 "Nita's Waltz" - 6:57
 "Bone and Bari" - 6:20
 "Heart and Soul" (Hoagy Carmichael, Frank Loesser) - 4:50
 "Again" (Dorcas Cochran, Lionel Newman) - 7:19
 "Pickup" - 5:46

Personnel
Curtis Fuller - trombone (except track 5)
Tate Houston - baritone saxophone (except track 4)
Sonny Clark - piano
Paul Chambers - bass
Art Taylor - drums

References 

1958 albums
Albums produced by Alfred Lion
Albums recorded at Van Gelder Studio
Blue Note Records albums
Curtis Fuller albums